The 1950 Pittsburgh Pirates season was the 69th season of the Pittsburgh Pirates franchise; the 64th in the National League. The Pirates finished eighth and last in the league standings with a record of 57–96.

Regular season

Season standings

Record vs. opponents

Game log

|- bgcolor="ffbbbb"
| 1 || April 18 || @ Cardinals || 2–4 || Staley || Chesnes (0–1) || — || 20,871 || 0–1
|- bgcolor="ccffcc"
| 2 || April 19 || @ Cardinals || 4–3 || Chambers (1–0) || Munger || — || 5,648 || 1–1
|- bgcolor="ccffcc"
| 3 || April 20 || @ Cardinals || 8–4 || Dickson (1–0) || Pollet || — || 4,235 || 2–1
|- bgcolor="ccffcc"
| 4 || April 21 || Reds || 7–5 || Werle (1–0) || Wehmeier || Lombardi (1) || 32,685 || 3–1
|- bgcolor="ccffcc"
| 5 || April 22 || Reds || 9–2 || Chesnes (1–1) || Hetki || — || 14,533 || 4–1
|- bgcolor="ccffcc"
| 6 || April 23 || Reds || 5–3 || Chambers (2–0) || Smith || — || 18,049 || 5–1
|- bgcolor="ffbbbb"
| 7 || April 27 || Cardinals || 2–5 || Munger || Dickson (1–1) || — || 34,995 || 5–2
|- bgcolor="ccffcc"
| 8 || April 28 || Cardinals || 4–3 || Werle (2–0) || Staley || Main (1) || 10,102 || 6–2
|- bgcolor="ffbbbb"
| 9 || April 29 || @ Reds || 6–14 || Erautt || Chesnes (1–2) || — || 4,895 || 6–3
|- bgcolor="ffbbbb"
| 10 || April 30 || @ Reds || 2–4 || Fox || Chambers (2–1) || Wehmeier ||  || 6–4
|- bgcolor="ffbbbb"
| 11 || April 30 || @ Reds || 1–2 || Blackwell || Queen (0–1) || — || 10,759 || 6–5
|-

|- bgcolor="ccffcc"
| 12 || May 2 || Braves || 6–1 || Dickson (2–1) || Spahn || — || 24,115 || 7–5
|- bgcolor="ffbbbb"
| 13 || May 3 || Braves || 4–15 || Sain || Lombardi (0–1) || — || 9,389 || 7–6
|- bgcolor="ccffcc"
| 14 || May 4 || Giants || 3–1 || Chambers (3–1) || Jansen || — || 6,680 || 8–6
|- bgcolor="ccffcc"
| 15 || May 5 || Giants || 5–4 || Queen (1–1) || Jones || Werle (1) || 31,785 || 9–6
|- bgcolor="ffbbbb"
| 16 || May 6 || Giants || 8–9 || Maglie || Lombardi (0–2) || Hansen || 13,577 || 9–7
|- bgcolor="ffbbbb"
| 17 || May 7 || Dodgers || 2–3 || Barney || Dickson (2–2) || Erskine || 33,734 || 9–8
|- bgcolor="ffbbbb"
| 18 || May 8 || Dodgers || 5–7 || Podbielan || Chambers (3–2) || Banta || 9,476 || 9–9
|- bgcolor="ccffcc"
| 19 || May 9 || Dodgers || 10–5 || Werle (3–0) || Palica || — || 26,734 || 10–9
|- bgcolor="ffbbbb"
| 20 || May 11 || Phillies || 2–3 || Roberts || Dickson (2–3) || — || 28,452 || 10–10
|- bgcolor="ffbbbb"
| 21 || May 12 || @ Cubs || 3–6 || Rush || Gregg (0–1) || — || 8,763 || 10–11
|- bgcolor="ffbbbb"
| 22 || May 13 || @ Cubs || 3–4 || Hiller || Chambers (3–3) || Dubiel || 25,453 || 10–12
|- bgcolor="ccffcc"
| 23 || May 14 || @ Cubs || 6–5 || Chesnes (2–2) || Leonard || Werle (2) ||  || 11–12
|- bgcolor="ccffcc"
| 24 || May 14 || @ Cubs || 16–9 || Main (1–0) || Lade || Werle (3) || 34,659 || 12–12
|- bgcolor="ffbbbb"
| 25 || May 16 || @ Braves || 0–3 || Sain || Dickson (2–4) || — || 10,273 || 12–13
|- bgcolor="ccffcc"
| 26 || May 17 || @ Braves || 4–1 || Chambers (4–3) || Bickford || — || 13,384 || 13–13
|- bgcolor="ffbbbb"
| 27 || May 20 || @ Dodgers || 2–3 || Banta || Queen (1–2) || — ||  || 13–14
|- bgcolor="ffbbbb"
| 28 || May 20 || @ Dodgers || 3–4 (11) || Bankhead || Werle (3–1) || — || 20,311 || 13–15
|- bgcolor="ccffcc"
| 29 || May 21 || @ Giants || 4–2 || Chesnes (3–2) || Jansen || — ||  || 14–15
|- bgcolor="ccffcc"
| 30 || May 21 || @ Giants || 8–6 || Chambers (5–3) || Jones || Werle (4) || 34,972 || 15–15
|- bgcolor="ccffcc"
| 31 || May 23 || @ Phillies || 6–0 || Macdonald (1–0) || Meyer || — || 12,428 || 16–15
|- bgcolor="ffbbbb"
| 32 || May 24 || @ Phillies || 3–6 || Konstanty || Werle (3–2) || — || 18,993 || 16–16
|- bgcolor="ffbbbb"
| 33 || May 25 || @ Phillies || 0–3 || Miller || Chambers (5–4) || — || 5,265 || 16–17
|- bgcolor="ffbbbb"
| 34 || May 26 || Cubs || 0–4 || Hiller || Queen (1–3) || — || 22,526 || 16–18
|- bgcolor="ffbbbb"
| 35 || May 27 || Cubs || 5–7 || Minner || Chesnes (3–3) || Leonard || 10,220 || 16–19
|- bgcolor="ffbbbb"
| 36 || May 28 || Cubs || 0–6 || Schmitz || Dickson (2–5) || — ||  || 16–20
|- bgcolor="ffbbbb"
| 37 || May 28 || Cubs || 1–5 || Rush || Lombardi (0–3) || — || 23,873 || 16–21
|- bgcolor="ffbbbb"
| 38 || May 30 || Cardinals || 13–17 || Staley || Werle (3–3) || Brazle ||  || 16–22
|- bgcolor="ffbbbb"
| 39 || May 30 || Cardinals || 5–8 || Staley || Dickson (2–6) || — || 33,182 || 16–23
|-

|- bgcolor="ffbbbb"
| 40 || June 1 || Braves || 2–14 || Bickford || Queen (1–4) || — || 5,468 || 16–24
|- bgcolor="ccffcc"
| 41 || June 2 || Braves || 5–4 || Macdonald (2–0) || Spahn || — || 23,549 || 17–24
|- bgcolor="ffbbbb"
| 42 || June 3 || Braves || 6–10 || Sain || Lombardi (0–4) || Hogue || 5,737 || 17–25
|- bgcolor="ffbbbb"
| 43 || June 4 || Giants || 3–4 || Maglie || Chambers (5–5) || Kennedy || 14,534 || 17–26
|- bgcolor="ffbbbb"
| 44 || June 5 || Giants || 4–5 (10) || Koslo || Walsh (0–1) || Hansen || 16,733 || 17–27
|- bgcolor="ffbbbb"
| 45 || June 6 || Giants || 4–10 || Kramer || Queen (1–5) || — || 5,111 || 17–28
|- bgcolor="ffbbbb"
| 46 || June 7 || Dodgers || 0–9 || Newcombe || Macdonald (2–1) || — || 30,904 || 17–29
|- bgcolor="ccffcc"
| 47 || June 8 || Dodgers || 4–3 || Chambers (6–5) || Branca || Werle (5) || 22,697 || 18–29
|- bgcolor="ffbbbb"
| 48 || June 9 || Dodgers || 7–9 || Podbielan || Werle (3–4) || Newcombe || 9,510 || 18–30
|- bgcolor="ffbbbb"
| 49 || June 11 || Phillies || 6–7 || Konstanty || Law (0–1) || — ||  || 18–31
|- bgcolor="ccffcc"
| 50 || June 11 || Phillies || 5–4 (12) || Werle (4–4) || Donnelly || — || 33,217 || 19–31
|- bgcolor="ffbbbb"
| 51 || June 13 || @ Giants || 0–7 || Jansen || Chambers (6–6) || — || 15,088 || 19–32
|- bgcolor="ffbbbb"
| 52 || June 16 || @ Braves || 5–6 || Sain || Queen (1–6) || — || 15,866 || 19–33
|- bgcolor="ffbbbb"
| 53 || June 17 || @ Braves || 6–15 || Hogue || Borowy (0–1) || — || 6,272 || 19–34
|- bgcolor="ffbbbb"
| 54 || June 18 || @ Braves || 6–8 || Roy || Dickson (2–7) || — ||  || 19–35
|- bgcolor="ffffff"
| 55 || June 18 || @ Braves || 8–8 ||  ||  || — || 22,817 || 19–35
|- bgcolor="ccffcc"
| 56 || June 19 || @ Braves || 1–0 || Chambers (7–6) || Spahn || — || 5,578 || 20–35
|- bgcolor="ffbbbb"
| 57 || June 20 || @ Phillies || 3–7 || Meyer || Law (0–2) || — || 13,597 || 20–36
|- bgcolor="ccffcc"
| 58 || June 21 || @ Phillies || 5–3 || Macdonald (3–1) || Roberts || Werle (6) || 18,632 || 21–36
|- bgcolor="ffbbbb"
| 59 || June 22 || @ Phillies || 4–7 || Miller || Borowy (0–2) || — || 5,326 || 21–37
|- bgcolor="ffbbbb"
| 60 || June 23 || @ Dodgers || 3–15 || Podbielan || Dickson (2–8) || — || 25,519 || 21–38
|- bgcolor="ffbbbb"
| 61 || June 24 || @ Dodgers || 12–21 || Roe || Werle (4–5) || — || 22,010 || 21–39
|- bgcolor="ccffcc"
| 62 || June 25 || @ Dodgers || 16–11 || Chambers (8–6) || Branca || Macdonald (1) || 20,196 || 22–39
|- bgcolor="ffbbbb"
| 63 || June 27 || Reds || 3–8 || Wehmeier || Macdonald (3–2) || Blackwell || 13,500 || 22–40
|- bgcolor="ccffcc"
| 64 || June 28 || Reds || 6–5 || Dickson (3–8) || Smith || — || 12,040 || 23–40
|- bgcolor="ffbbbb"
| 65 || June 30 || @ Cardinals || 4–9 || Staley || Chambers (8–7) || — || 12,631 || 23–41
|-

|- bgcolor="ffbbbb"
| 66 || July 1 || @ Cardinals || 4–5 || Pollet || Queen (1–7) || Brazle || 15,795 || 23–42
|- bgcolor="ffbbbb"
| 67 || July 2 || @ Cardinals || 1–2 || Munger || Werle (4–6) || Brazle || 25,630 || 23–43
|- bgcolor="ffbbbb"
| 68 || July 3 || @ Reds || 5–8 || Ramsdell || Dickson (3–9) || Blackwell || 3,405 || 23–44
|- bgcolor="ffbbbb"
| 69 || July 4 || @ Reds || 4–8 || Wehmeier || Chambers (8–8) || — ||  || 23–45
|- bgcolor="ffbbbb"
| 70 || July 4 || @ Reds || 4–5 || Fox || Macdonald (3–3) || — || 10,728 || 23–46
|- bgcolor="ccffcc"
| 71 || July 5 || @ Cubs || 4–1 || Queen (2–7) || Lade || — || 10,815 || 24–46
|- bgcolor="ffbbbb"
| 72 || July 6 || @ Cubs || 2–4 || Minner || Werle (4–7) || — || 12,953 || 24–47
|- bgcolor="ccffcc"
| 73 || July 7 || Cardinals || 9–1 || Law (1–2) || Staley || — || 28,468 || 25–47
|- bgcolor="ccffcc"
| 74 || July 8 || Cardinals || 7–6 || Dickson (4–9) || Brecheen || — || 15,224 || 26–47
|- bgcolor="ccffcc"
| 75 || July 9 || Cardinals || 3–2 || Queen (3–7) || Lanier || Werle (7) || 21,431 || 27–47
|- bgcolor="ffbbbb"
| 76 || July 14 || Giants || 5–7 || Maglie || Chambers (8–9) || — || 29,323 || 27–48
|- bgcolor="ccffcc"
| 77 || July 15 || Giants || 2–1 || Werle (5–7) || Jansen || — || 11,958 || 28–48
|- bgcolor="ffbbbb"
| 78 || July 16 || Braves || 5–9 || Bickford || Law (1–3) || — ||  || 28–49
|- bgcolor="ccffcc"
| 79 || July 16 || Braves || 6–5 || Borowy (1–2) || Hogue || — || 29,363 || 29–49
|- bgcolor="ffbbbb"
| 80 || July 17 || Braves || 6–8 || Johnson || Borowy (1–3) || Hogue || 21,450 || 29–50
|- bgcolor="ffbbbb"
| 81 || July 18 || Braves || 3–11 || Spahn || Dickson (4–10) || — || 5,445 || 29–51
|- bgcolor="ffbbbb"
| 82 || July 19 || Phillies || 2–3 (11) || Simmons || Werle (5–8) || Konstanty ||  || 29–52
|- bgcolor="ccffcc"
| 83 || July 19 || Phillies || 4–2 || Macdonald (4–3) || Meyer || — || 18,953 || 30–52
|- bgcolor="ccffcc"
| 84 || July 20 || Phillies || 10–8 || Dickson (5–10) || Donnelly || — || 7,291 || 31–52
|- bgcolor="ffbbbb"
| 85 || July 21 || Phillies || 1–4 || Church || Queen (3–8) || — || 34,016 || 31–53
|- bgcolor="ffbbbb"
| 86 || July 22 || Dodgers || 3–12 || Branca || Pierro (0–1) || — || 18,103 || 31–54
|- bgcolor="ffbbbb"
| 87 || July 23 || Dodgers || 6–11 || Barney || Chambers (8–10) || Newcombe || 25,889 || 31–55
|- bgcolor="ccffcc"
| 88 || July 24 || Phillies || 2–1 (6) || Macdonald (5–3) || Miller || — || 15,431 || 32–55
|- bgcolor="ffbbbb"
| 89 || July 25 || @ Braves || 2–7 || Sain || Pierro (0–2) || — || 18,461 || 32–56
|- bgcolor="ccffcc"
| 90 || July 26 || @ Braves || 8–4 || Queen (4–8) || Bickford || Dickson (1) || 12,689 || 33–56
|- bgcolor="ffbbbb"
| 91 || July 27 || @ Braves || 3–5 || Spahn || Chambers (8–11) || — || 8,302 || 33–57
|- bgcolor="ffbbbb"
| 92 || July 28 || @ Phillies || 1–4 || Miller || Macdonald (5–4) || — || 7,343 || 33–58
|- bgcolor="ccffcc"
| 93 || July 29 || @ Phillies || 7–4 || Werle (6–8) || Church || — || 10,252 || 34–58
|- bgcolor="ffbbbb"
| 94 || July 30 || @ Phillies || 0–10 || Roberts || Queen (4–9) || — ||  || 34–59
|- bgcolor="ffbbbb"
| 95 || July 30 || @ Phillies || 2–4 || Konstanty || Dickson (5–11) || Meyer || 21,411 || 34–60
|-

|- bgcolor="ffbbbb"
| 96 || August 1 || @ Dodgers || 1–3 || Palica || Chambers (8–12) || — || 16,691 || 34–61
|- bgcolor="ffbbbb"
| 97 || August 2 || @ Dodgers || 4–5 (10) || Branca || Dickson (5–12) || — || 6,361 || 34–62
|- bgcolor="ffbbbb"
| 98 || August 4 || @ Giants || 2–3 || Jones || Law (1–4) || Koslo || 14,238 || 34–63
|- bgcolor="ffbbbb"
| 99 || August 5 || @ Giants || 0–5 || Hearn || Queen (4–10) || — || 9,264 || 34–64
|- bgcolor="ffbbbb"
| 100 || August 6 || @ Giants || 0–5 || Jansen || Werle (6–9) || — || 17,182 || 34–65
|- bgcolor="ffbbbb"
| 101 || August 6 || @ Giants || 0–3 || Maglie || Dickson (5–13) || — || 17,182 || 34–66
|- bgcolor="ffbbbb"
| 102 || August 8 || Cardinals || 4–6 || Martin || Chambers (8–13) || — || 18,243 || 34–67
|- bgcolor="ccffcc"
| 103 || August 10 || Cubs || 7–4 || Law (2–4) || Minner || Dickson (2) || 10,087 || 35–67
|- bgcolor="ffbbbb"
| 104 || August 11 || Cubs || 1–3 || Hiller || Werle (6–10) || — || 11,082 || 35–68
|- bgcolor="ffbbbb"
| 105 || August 12 || Cubs || 2–7 || Rush || Macdonald (5–5) || — || 6,770 || 35–69
|- bgcolor="ccffcc"
| 106 || August 13 || Cubs || 7–4 || Chambers (9–13) || Schmitz || — ||  || 36–69
|- bgcolor="ccffcc"
| 107 || August 13 || Cubs || 2–0 || Queen (5–10) || Dubiel || — || 18,162 || 37–69
|- bgcolor="ffbbbb"
| 108 || August 14 || Reds || 8–13 || Smith || Lombardi (0–5) || — || 4,306 || 37–70
|- bgcolor="ccffcc"
| 109 || August 15 || Reds || 10–9 || Macdonald (6–5) || Hetki || — || 5,495 || 38–70
|- bgcolor="ccffcc"
| 110 || August 16 || @ Cardinals || 5–3 || Law (3–4) || Boyer || Dickson (3) || 12,134 || 39–70
|- bgcolor="ccffcc"
| 111 || August 18 || @ Cubs || 9–3 || Chambers (10–13) || Dubiel || — || 3,823 || 40–70
|- bgcolor="ccffcc"
| 112 || August 19 || @ Cubs || 13–8 || Dickson (6–13) || Rush || Werle (8) || 13,290 || 41–70
|- bgcolor="ffbbbb"
| 113 || August 20 || @ Cubs || 2–4 || Minner || Law (3–5) || — ||  || 41–71
|- bgcolor="ffbbbb"
| 114 || August 20 || @ Cubs || 2–5 || Hiller || Macdonald (6–6) || — || 29,589 || 41–72
|- bgcolor="ffbbbb"
| 115 || August 21 || Dodgers || 2–3 || Newcombe || Werle (6–11) || — || 7,666 || 41–73
|- bgcolor="ffbbbb"
| 116 || August 22 || Dodgers || 8–10 || Palica || Queen (5–11) || Branca || 19,526 || 41–74
|- bgcolor="ffbbbb"
| 117 || August 23 || Dodgers || 5–7 (17) || Branca || Queen (5–12) || — || 16,382 || 41–75
|- bgcolor="ffbbbb"
| 118 || August 24 || Phillies || 2–4 || Church || Law (3–6) || — || 9,096 || 41–76
|- bgcolor="ffbbbb"
| 119 || August 25 || Phillies || 7–9 (15) || Konstanty || Chambers (10–14) || — || 25,686 || 41–77
|- bgcolor="ccffcc"
| 120 || August 26 || Phillies || 14–4 || Dickson (7–13) || Roberts || — || 12,157 || 42–77
|- bgcolor="ffbbbb"
| 121 || August 27 || Braves || 3–7 (13) || Surkont || Werle (6–12) || — ||  || 42–78
|- bgcolor="ffbbbb"
| 122 || August 27 || Braves || 1–4 || Roy || Queen (5–13) || — || 24,279 || 42–79
|- bgcolor="ffbbbb"
| 123 || August 29 || Giants || 5–10 || Jansen || Law (3–7) || — || 13,850 || 42–80
|- bgcolor="ffbbbb"
| 124 || August 30 || Giants || 0–4 || Maglie || Chambers (10–15) || — || 7,794 || 42–81
|- bgcolor="ffbbbb"
| 125 || August 31 || Giants || 1–2 || Hearn || Macdonald (6–7) || — || 3,552 || 42–82
|-

|- bgcolor="ccffcc"
| 126 || September 1 || Cardinals || 10–4 || Werle (7–12) || Boyer || — || 12,589 || 43–82
|- bgcolor="ccffcc"
| 127 || September 2 || Cardinals || 6–0 || Law (4–7) || Staley || — || 5,638 || 44–82
|- bgcolor="ccffcc"
| 128 || September 3 || Cardinals || 12–11 (10) || Werle (8–12) || Brecheen || — || 12,736 || 45–82
|- bgcolor="ccffcc"
| 129 || September 4 || Cubs || 5–3 || Barrett (1–0) || Dubiel || Walsh (1) ||  || 46–82
|- bgcolor="ccffcc"
| 130 || September 4 || Cubs || 3–0 || Macdonald (7–7) || Rush || — || 20,695 || 47–82
|- bgcolor="ccffcc"
| 131 || September 6 || @ Reds || 3–2 || Law (5–7) || Blackwell || — || 7,079 || 48–82
|- bgcolor="ffbbbb"
| 132 || September 7 || @ Reds || 4–6 (10) || Erautt || Barrett (1–1) || — || 1,176 || 48–83
|- bgcolor="ccffcc"
| 133 || September 9 || @ Cardinals || 5–4 || Dickson (8–13) || Pollet || — || 13,527 || 49–83
|- bgcolor="ffbbbb"
| 134 || September 10 || @ Cardinals || 5–6 (10) || Wilks || Barrett (1–2) || — ||  || 49–84
|- bgcolor="ccffcc"
| 135 || September 10 || @ Cardinals || 6–2 || Macdonald (8–7) || Dusak || — || 12,436 || 50–84
|- bgcolor="ffbbbb"
| 136 || September 12 || @ Giants || 0–3 || Jones || Werle (8–13) || — || 4,112 || 50–85
|- bgcolor="ffbbbb"
| 137 || September 13 || @ Giants || 1–3 (7) || Maglie || Law (5–8) || — || 11,684 || 50–86
|- bgcolor="ccffcc"
| 138 || September 14 || @ Giants || 7–1 || Dickson (9–13) || Jansen || — || 4,272 || 51–86
|- bgcolor="ffbbbb"
| 139 || September 14 || @ Giants || 1–6 || Hearn || Macdonald (8–8) || — ||  || 51–87
|- bgcolor="ffbbbb"
| 140 || September 15 || @ Braves || 4–7 || Surkont || Queen (5–14) || — || 9,168 || 51–88
|- bgcolor="ccffcc"
| 141 || September 16 || @ Braves || 4–0 (12) || Chambers (11–15) || Bickford || — || 4,606 || 52–88
|- bgcolor="ffbbbb"
| 142 || September 17 || @ Phillies || 3–5 || Meyer || Werle (8–14) || Konstanty || 20,031 || 52–89
|- bgcolor="ffbbbb"
| 143 || September 19 || @ Dodgers || 3–14 || Newcombe || Law (5–9) || — ||  || 52–90
|- bgcolor="ffbbbb"
| 144 || September 19 || @ Dodgers || 2–3 || Palica || Dickson (9–14) || — || 2,637 || 52–91
|- bgcolor="ffbbbb"
| 145 || September 20 || @ Dodgers || 2–7 || Erskine || Macdonald (8–9) || — || 1,011 || 52–92
|- bgcolor="ffbbbb"
| 146 || September 21 || @ Dodgers || 8–10 || Palica || Werle (8–15) || — || 5,241 || 52–93
|- bgcolor="ccffcc"
| 147 || September 22 || Reds || 8–7 (10) || Walsh (1–1) || Smith || — || 12,979 || 53–93
|- bgcolor="ccffcc"
| 148 || September 23 || Reds || 8–7 || Law (6–9) || Wehmeier || Walsh (2) || 4,009 || 54–93
|- bgcolor="ffbbbb"
| 149 || September 24 || Reds || 1–7 || Blackwell || Macdonald (8–10) || — ||  || 54–94
|- bgcolor="ccffcc"
| 150 || September 24 || Reds || 3–2 || Dickson (10–14) || Raffensberger || — || 25,233 || 55–94
|- bgcolor="ccffcc"
| 151 || September 27 || @ Cubs || 7–4 || Law (7–9) || Dubiel || — || 4,783 || 56–94
|- bgcolor="ffbbbb"
| 152 || September 30 || @ Reds || 2–5 || Fox || Werle (8–16) || — || 1,719 || 56–95
|-

|- bgcolor="ffbbbb"
| 153 || October 1 || @ Reds || 2–3 || Erautt || Dickson (10–15) || — ||  || 56–96
|- bgcolor="ccffcc"
| 154 || October 1 || @ Reds || 3–1 || Chambers (12–15) || Byerly || — || 8,390 || 57–96
|-

|-
| Legend:       = Win       = Loss       = TieBold = Pirates team member

Opening Day lineup

Roster

Player stats

Batting

Starters by position 
Note: Pos = Position; G = Games played; AB = At bats; H = Hits; Avg. = Batting average; HR = Home runs; RBI = Runs batted in

Other batters 
Note: G = Games played; AB = At bats; H = Hits; Avg. = Batting average; HR = Home runs; RBI = Runs batted in

Pitching

Starting pitchers 
Note: G = Games pitched; IP = Innings pitched; W = Wins; L = Losses; ERA = Earned run average; SO = Strikeouts

Other pitchers 
Note: G = Games pitched; IP = Innings pitched; W = Wins; L = Losses; ERA = Earned run average; SO = Strikeouts

Relief pitchers 
Note: G = Games pitched; W = Wins; L = Losses; SV = Saves; ERA = Earned run average; SO = Strikeouts

Farm system

LEAGUE CHAMPIONS: Modesto, Hutchinson, Tallahassee, Mayfield

References

External links
 1950 Pittsburgh Pirates at Baseball Reference
 1950 Pittsburgh Pirates at Baseball Almanac

Pittsburgh Pirates seasons
Pittsburgh Pirates season
Pittsburg Pir